Queen's Landing is a concrete pier on the shore of Lake Michigan, east of Lake Shore Drive, across from Buckingham Fountain in Grant Park, Chicago, Illinois, United States. It takes its name from being the site where Queen Elizabeth II and Prince Philip, Duke of Edinburgh disembarked from a royal barge in 1959 during the first visit by a reigning British monarch to Chicago.

History

Royal visit 

Chicago Mayor Richard J. Daley invited Elizabeth II and Prince Philip to Chicago after the Saint Lawrence Seaway opened in the summer of 1959. The monarchs traveled through the seaway on the royal yacht HMY Britannia, which was escorted by seven warships, many other small craft, and two Chinese junks. On Monday, 6 July 1959, more than a million people gathered at the lake shore to see the royal couple. Mayor Daley's special events director, Colonel Jack Reilly, sent over 700 invitations to the reception. Elizabeth gave a short speech after disembarking, and she was greeted by Mayor Daley and his wife, as well as Illinois Governor William Stratton and his wife, Shirley. Elizabeth reviewed some troops that were posted at the lakefront, and the monarchs moved on to a thirteen hour tour of the city.

The royal entourage headed west to Michigan Avenue, where the parade turned right and headed north through the Loop and over the Chicago River until reaching Navy Pier. Elizabeth and Philip went to the International Trade Fair, where they walked down the world's longest red carpet, which spanned 2,300 feet. The monarchs proceed to visit the Ambassador Hotel for lunch, after which they toured the campus of the University of Chicago as well as the Museum of Science and Industry. The couple then went to the Art Institute of Chicago for a brief visit and attended a reception at the Drake Hotel, where they were greeted by Midwestern governors and mayors. However, the tour experienced one delay: Elizabeth II had to receive an emergency tooth filling. Afterwards, the monarchs traveled to a banquet at Conrad Hilton Hotel, which was hosted by Mayor Daley. Almost 1,000 people participated in the dinner service, with attendees including Etta Moten Barnett and John H. Sengstacke. Elizabeth told the diners that "Ever since we landed this morning we have not ceased to be impressed by the massive dignity of your city…We shall carry with us…a memory of the generous hospitality of Chicago which will long warm our hearts.” Later that evening, fireworks were displayed at the lakefront, and Elizabeth told Mayor Daley “This is an unforgettable day – a day I will never forget.”

Lake Shore Drive crosswalk 
In 1988, a crosswalk was created at Lake Shore Drive between Queen's Landing and Buckingham Fountain to facilitate pedestrian traffic. In 2005, this crosswalk was removed, meaning that pedestrians wanting to cross the street towards Queen's Landing had to travel a quarter-mile north or south to Jackson Drive or Balbo Drive respectively if they wanted to use a marked crosswalk. Despite the removal of the crosswalk, pedestrians kept crossing Lake Shore Drive at the same location in order to save time. The crosswalk was eventually restored in 2011 at a cost of $125,000.

References 

Piers in Illinois
Buildings and structures in Chicago